"El Capitan" is a song by Scottish rock band Idlewild from their fourth studio album, Warnings/Promises (2005). It was released as the third single from the album on 11 July 2005 and charted at  39 in the UK Singles Chart.

The Walkmen's Paul Maroon plays piano on the track.

The title and lyrics refer to the El Capitan granite formation in Yosemite Valley, California.

Track listings

In the UK

All songs by Idlewild unless otherwise stated.

7" R6667
"El Capitan"
"The Bronze Medal (acoustic)"
7" (red vinyl) R6667X
"El Capitan (acoustic)"
"Winter Is Blue (acoustic)"  (Vashti Bunyan)
CD CDRS6667
"El Capitan"
"El Capitan (acoustic)"
"Winter Is Blue (acoustic)" (Bunyan)

References

2005 singles
Idlewild (band) songs
2005 songs
Parlophone singles
Song recordings produced by Tony Hoffer
Songs written by Bob Fairfoull
Songs written by Colin Newton
Songs written by Rod Jones (musician)
Songs written by Roddy Woomble